The 1898 Georgia hurricane was a major hurricane that hit the U.S. state of Georgia, as well as the strongest on record in the state. It was first observed on September 29, although modern researchers estimated that it developed four days earlier to the east of the Lesser Antilles. That day, it made landfall on Cumberland Island in Camden County, Georgia, causing record storm surge flooding. The hurricane caused heavy damage throughout the region, and killed at least 179 people. Impact was most severe in Brunswick, where a  storm surge was recorded. Overall damage was estimated at $1.5 million (1898 USD), most of which occurred in Georgia. In extreme northeastern Florida, strong winds nearly destroyed the city of Fernandina, while light crop damage was reported in southern South Carolina. After moving ashore, the hurricane quickly weakened and traversed much of North America; it continued northwestward until reaching the Ohio Valley and turning northeastward, and it was last observed on October 6 near Newfoundland.

Meteorological history 

On September 28, 1898, island stations in the Lesser Antilles indicated the presence of a tropical cyclone, which was confirmed by the next day. For most of its duration, the system maintained a northwest track, reaching hurricane status on September 27. Its intensification rate slowed on September 28, before strengthening continued on October 1. The winds reached , which is the equivalent of a major hurricane, or Category 3 on the Saffir-Simpson scale. Around that time, the hurricane turned toward more to the west-northwest, due to a large ridge across the western Atlantic.

On October 2, the hurricane continued toward the west-northwest, approaching the southeastern United States. That day, it made landfall on Cumberland Island in Camden County, Georgia, and initially was thought to have done so as a Category 2 on the Saffir-Simpson scale. Such intensity ranked the hurricane tied for the 16th strongest United States landfall, as well as the strongest in the state of Georgia. It is also the most recent major hurricane to hit the state. After making landfall, the hurricane quickly weakened, deteriorating to tropical storm status within 12 hours. After moving across Georgia, the storm weakened further to tropical depression status over northeastern Alabama on October 3. It continued northwestward through the Ohio Valley before recurving northeastward, accelerating through southeastern Canada and later dissipating over Newfoundland on October 6.

Impact 

On October 1, a day before the hurricane moved ashore, the U.S. Weather Bureau issued northeast storm signals from Key West, Florida, to Norfolk, Virginia. Similar warnings were issued in the hours preceding the hurricane moving ashore. The advisories were credited with saving dozens of lives and millions of dollars in shipping cargo, due to advance warning for boats to remain ashore.

Before the hurricane made landfall in Georgia, it produced strong winds in northeastern Florida, reaching Category 2 strength on the Saffir-Simpson scale. The worst effects from the storm were confined to a very small portion of extreme northeastern Florida. The October 1898 Monthly Weather Review described Fernandina as "nearly destroyed", and most anchored boats were sunk or washed inland into the marshes. Damage along the coastline reached as far south as Mayport. However, for the first time in the history of the city, all communications were cut between Jacksonville and cities further north, such as New York. Damage throughout the state was estimated at $500,000 (1898 USD).

It produced record storm surges across the coastline, including a  report in Brunswick. There, damage was heaviest, and most buildings were flooded. Similar impact was reported in Darien, where 32 people were killed. One coastal location reported the hurricane as causing the worst flooding since 1812. The storm surge flooding entered warehouses and storage areas all along the coast, leaving many small ships wrecked or sunk. Heavy damage also occurred to coastal wharves and houses. According to the Savannah Weather Bureau office, about 5,000 barrels of rosin were dispersed, and 60,000 bushels of rice were wrecked. Winds in the city reached , and the flooding severely damaged the railway to nearby Tybee Island. Along the Blackbeard Island National Wildlife Refuge, the hurricane destroyed a hospital that helped people afflicted with yellow fever. A total of 179 people were killed along the Georgia coast, and damage totaled around $1 million (1898 USD). In South Carolina, the hurricane produced gusty winds and storm surge flooding. Some slight damage occurred at Port Royal, and in the southern portion of the state, the high tides left damage to rice and cotton crops. The Charleston Weather Bureau reported that "a number of persons were drowned along the South Carolina coast". Heavy rainfall was reported across northeast Florida, Georgia, and the western Carolinas.

See also 

 List of Florida hurricanes (pre-1900)

References 

1890s Atlantic hurricane seasons
Category 4 Atlantic hurricanes
Hurricanes in Georgia (U.S. state)
Hurricanes in Florida
Hurricanes in South Carolina
1898 natural disasters in the United States
1898 meteorology